Tan (Tañ) is a rural locality (a selo) and the administrative centre of Tanovsky Selsoviet, Blagovarsky District, Bashkortostan, Russia. The population was 648 as of 2010. There are 10 streets.

Geography 
Tan is located 18 km north of Yazykovo (the district's administrative centre) by road. Zur-Bulyak is the nearest rural locality.

References 

Rural localities in Blagovarsky District